Chico A. Lanete (born August 1, 1979) is a Filipino professional basketball coach and former player. He is the head coach for the Chooks-to-Go 3x3 pro circuit teams. In 5×5 full court basketball, he last played for the Bicol Volcanoes of the Maharlika Pilipinas Basketball League (MPBL). He grew up in Isabela, Basilan and then played for Southern City Colleges in Zamboanga City during college before moving to Lyceum of the Philippines University.

College career
Lanete and his brother Von both played for Southern City Colleges in Zamboanga City before the latter moved to Cebu and played for the University of the Visayas Green Lancers under coach Boy Cabahug, and the former to the Lyceum of the Philippines University.

Professional career
Lanete was an undrafted player in the 2007 PBA draft but was later signed by the Purefoods Tender Juicy Giants before moving to the Barangay Ginebra Kings.

In 2009, he was signed by the Burger King Whoppers.

On January 5, 2010, he and Gary David were traded to the Coca-Cola Tigers for Alex Cabagnot and Wesley Gonzales.

In late 2011, Lanete was signed by the Meralco Bolts.

On January 25, 2012, Lanete was traded by Meralco to the Barako Bull Energy in exchange for Paul Artadi.

On March 20, 2012, Lanete was traded to the Petron Blaze Boosters in exchange for forward Marc Agustin.

On August 24, 2014, in the day of the 2014 PBA draft, Lanete returned to the Energy after being traded along with Jojo Duncil, San Miguel's 2014 second round pick (who turned out to be Gab Banal) and their 2016 first round pick in exchange of Barako Bull's 2014 third overall pick (which San Miguel used to pick Ronald Pascual).

Coaching career
Lanete was appointed as assistant coach to Eric Altamirano who will be guiding three Chooks-to-Go Pilipinas 3x3 teams that will participate in FIBA 3x3 tournaments. He will also help preparations of the Philippines men's national 3x3 team in the 2020 Summer Olympics qualifiers.

When Aldin Ayo resigned as head coach of the Chooks-to-Go 3x3 program in August 2022, Laneta was named as interim head coach.

PBA career statistics

Correct as of September 24, 2016

Season-by-season averages

|-
| align=left | 
| align=left | Purefoods
| 49 || 18.8 || .364 || .309 || .768 || 2.6 || 2.2 || 1.0 || .1 || 6.7
|-
| align=left | 
| align=left | Purefoods / Barangay Ginebra
| 46 || 18.8 || .335 || .234 || .787 || 2.5 || 1.8 || .9 || .1 || 5.5
|-
| align=left | 
| align=left | Burger King / Coca-Cola
| 29 || 22.7 || .426 || .290 || .587 || 3.2 || 2.8 || 1.2 || .0 || 7.9
|-
| align=left | 
| align=left | Powerade
| 28 || 25.4 || .371 || .321 || .774 || 4.0 || 3.0 || 1.0 || .0 || 7.3
|-
| align=left | 
| align=left | Meralco / Barako Bull / Petron
| 32 || 17.0 || .324 || .194 || .735 || 2.3 || 2.8 || .9 || .1 || 5.2
|-
| align=left | 
| align=left | Petron
| 32 || 12.8 || .402 || .284 || .571 || 1.2 || 1.3 || .9 || .1 || 4.0
|-
| align=left | 
| align=left | Petron / San Miguel
| 26 || 8.7 || .361 || .160 || .647 || .7 || .7 || .7 || .0 || 2.6
|-
| align=left | 
| align=left | Barako Bull
| 34 || 24.9 || .433 || .172 || .709 || 2.8 || 2.3 || 2.0 || .1 || 10.0
|-
| align=left | 
| align=left | Barako Bull / Phoenix
| 36 || 17.3 || .386 || .188 || .686 || 2.1 || 1.4 || .9 || .0 || 5.2
|-class=sortbottom
| align=center colspan=2 | Career
| 312 || 18.6 || .380 || .254 || .714 || 2.4 || 2.0 || 1.1 || .1 || 6.1

Personal life
Lanete's father was a college basketball player while his brothers Von Harry (Bon Bon) and Garvo are also basketball players, with the latter also playing in the PBA for six years.

References

External links
 
 

1979 births
Living people
Barangay Ginebra San Miguel players
Filipino men's basketball players
People from Ormoc
Basketball players from Leyte (province)
Magnolia Hotshots players
San Miguel Beermen players
Point guards
Barako Bull Energy players
Powerade Tigers players
Meralco Bolts players
Phoenix Super LPG Fuel Masters players
People from Isabela, Basilan
Lyceum Pirates basketball players
Filipino men's 3x3 basketball players